The 2013 Women's Basketball Invitational (WBI) was a single-elimination tournament of 16 National Collegiate Athletic Association (NCAA) Division I teams that did not participate in the 2013 NCAA Women's Division I Basketball Tournament or 2013 WNIT. The field of 16 was announced on March 18, 2013.  All games were hosted by the higher seed throughout the tournament, unless the higher seed's arena was unavailable. The championship game was hosted by the school with the higher end of the season RPI. The tournament was won by the Detroit Mercy Titans.

Bracket

West Region

East Region

WBI Championship Game

See also
 2013 NCAA Women's Division I Basketball Tournament
 2013 Women's National Invitation Tournament
 2012 Women's Basketball Invitational

References

Women's Basketball Invitational
Women's Basketball Invitational